Carol Rosen (1933-2014) was an American artist known for her sculpture, collage and book art.

Rosen née Mendes was born in 1933 in New York City. She attended Hunter College and went on to teach art in West Orange, New Jersey for 25 years before turning to creating art full time. She died on April 8, 2014.

Her work is in the collection of the Graphic Arts Collection of the Firestone Library at Princeton University, the Smithsonian American Art Museum, the United States Holocaust Memorial Museum, and the National Museum of Women in the Arts.

References

External links
Carol Rosen: Journey Into Darkness, Hunterdon Art Museum

1933 births
2014 deaths
Artists from New York City
Women book artists
Book artists
20th-century American women artists